Estadio Municipal Santa Rosa is a stadium in Ciudad Guzmán, Jalisco, Mexico. It is primarily used for soccer, and is the home field of the Mazorqueros F.C. It holds 4,000 people.

History
The stadium was built in the 1970s, between 1973 and 1979 it was the headquarters of the Club Deportivo Nacional, a team that played in the Second Division of Mexico during that period. 

Between 2007 and 2008 the stadium housed Cachorros UdeG, which represented the University of Guadalajara. 

In 2016 the stadium underwent a modernization to be the field of Mazorqueros F.C., whose main team played in the Liga TDP between 2016 and 2020. In 2019 the stadium field underwent a process of improvement in order to make it suitable for matches of Segunda División.

References

Sports venues in Jalisco
Football venues in Mexico